Saim is a male given name. Notable people with this name include:

 Saim Arıkan (born 1906), Turkish wrestler
 Saim Ayub (born 2002), Pakistani cricket player
 Saim Bugay (1934–2008), Turkish sculptor
 Saim Koca (born 1966), Turkish cross-country skier
 Saim Kokona (born 1934), Albanian cinematographer
 Saim Polatkan (1908–1991), Turkish equestrian
 Saim Ali (born 1989), Pakistani actor, model and television host

Masculine given names